Talčji Vrh (in older sources also Telčji Vrh) is a settlement northwest of the town of Črnomelj in the White Carniola area of southeastern Slovenia. It is part of the traditional region of Lower Carniola and is now included in the Southeast Slovenia Statistical Region.

References

External links

Talčji Vrh on Geopedia

Populated places in the Municipality of Črnomelj